Larry McCray (born April 5, 1960), is an American blues guitarist and singer from Magnolia, Arkansas.

Early life 
McCray, the second youngest of nine siblings, grew up living on a farm. McCray learned guitar from his sister, Clara. "She used to play real low-down and dirty", McCray recalled years later. His family moved to Saginaw, Michigan in 1972. McCray took his influence from his sibling and the three Kings (B.B., Freddie and Albert), to playing the local club circuit, with his brothers Carl on bass guitar and Steve on drums.

Music career 
After high school, McCray worked at General Motors on the assembly line, before recording his debut album, Ambition (1991), via Point Blank Records. It was recorded in a friend's basement recording studio in Detroit. He was soon touring with a fellow record label artist, Albert Collins. His 1993 follow-up, Delta Hurricane, was produced by the veteran British blues devotee, Mike Vernon.

In 1999, McCray recorded a cover version of Bob Dylan's "All Along the Watchtower" for the tribute album, Tangled Up in Blues. In 2000, McCray founded his own independent record label, Magnolia Records, and Believe It was its first release. The same year, McCray played alongside Jimmy Thackery, as guest guitarists on Sista Monica Parker's album, People Love the Blues. Magnolia released McCray's first live album, Live on Interstate 75, in mid-2006. This was followed with Larry McCray, in 2007.

His 2015 tour commenced at the King Biscuit Blues Festival in Helena-West Helena, Arkansas on October 11, where McCray was honored with the "Sunshine" Sonny Payne Award for Blues Excellence.

Personal life 
McCray has one son, Bleau McCray-Morel, with Kelly Morel.

Discography 
 Ambition (1990)
 Delta Hurricane (1993)
 Meet Me at the Lake with the Bluegills (1996)
 Born to Play the Blues (1998)
 Believe It (2000)
 Blues is My Business (2001)
 Live on Interstate 75 (2006)
 Larry McCray (2007)
 The Gibson Sessions (2015)
 Blues Without You (2022)

References

External links 
 Official website
 [ Biography] at Allmusic

1960 births
Living people
American blues guitarists
American male guitarists
American blues singers
American male singers
Blues musicians from Arkansas
Songwriters from Arkansas
Singers from Arkansas
Guitarists from Arkansas
20th-century American guitarists
20th-century American male musicians
American male songwriters